My Savior may refer to:

 My Savior (album), 2021 album by Carrie Underwood
 "My Savior" (song), 2005 song by Krystal Meyers

See also 
 Savior (disambiguation)